A stowaway or clandestine traveller is a person who secretly boards a vehicle, such as a ship, an aircraft, a train, cargo truck or bus.

Sometimes, the purpose is to get from one place to another without paying for transportation. In other cases, the goal is to enter another country without first obtaining a travel visa or other permission. Stowaways differ from people smuggling in that the stowaway needs to avoid detection by the truck driver, ship crew, and others responsible for the safe and secure operation of the transportation service.

Thousands of stowaways have travelled by sea or land over the last several centuries. A much smaller number of people have attempted to stowaway on aircraft. Many stowaways have died during the attempt, especially in cases of train surfing and wheel-well stowaway flights.

Origin 
The word takes its origin with the expression stow away. This stow away expression is old and was used for things (such as food), such usage is seen for instance in the 1689 book A New Voyage Round the World, Volume 1 or 1637 Journals of the House of Lords, Volume 11.

The word was also used (later) for people. This gave names such as stow-aways, when the correct current name in modern English language is stowaway. Depending on the circumstances, people were stowed away in order to hide themselves, or to be transported as slaves. The concept of people hiding is not so recent; it was yet forbidden (and so known) in 1748 by king of Spain, under the polizón denomination.

In the United States 
The US legislation set up a stowaway concept in 1850. Previously, entry into the territory was free  and the stowaway word might be older.

In 1891, the new US legislation required the boat to pay the return travel for people not admitted in US, even if stowaways were still admitted.

474 stowaways arrived in US in fiscal year 1910, and 528 next year.

In 1917, a new legislation defined a list of excludable aliens, including stowaways.

Several stowaways arrived in United States by boat during the first half of twentieth century; they were paying for 25 to 30 dollars to travel.

From 1843 
The Convention on Facilitation of International Maritime Traffic, 1965, as amended, (The FAL Convention), define stowaway as "A person who is secreted on a ship, or in cargo which is subsequently loaded on the ship, without the consent of the shipowner or the master or any other responsible person and who is detected on board the ship after it has departed from a port, or in the cargo while unloading it in the port of arrival, and is reported as a stowaway by the master to the appropriate authorities".

Unnoticed by the captain, crew, port officials and customs authorities, stowaways may gain access to a ship with or without the assistance of port personnel. Once on board the ship, stowaways hide in empty containers, cargo holds, tanks, tunnels, behind false panels, stores, accommodation areas, engine rooms, void spaces, cranes and chain lockers.

The presence of stowaways on board ships may bring serious consequences for ships and, by extension, to the shipping industry as a whole; the ship could be delayed in port; the repatriation of stowaways can be a very complex and costly procedure involving masters, shipowners, port authorities and agents, and the life of stowaways could be endangered as they may spend several days hidden, with the risk of suffocation and without any food or water.

By transport mode

Rail transportation 

Some undocumented migrants travel around Europe in trucks and trains without being detected. A number of them try to get to other European countries, such as France and the United Kingdom.

Land travel 
Stowaways sometimes hide themselves in vehicles such as cargo trucks to get between cities.  Although this is also done by migrants who have paid the driver, it is also done by individuals hiding from the driver.  In some places, drivers are legally responsible for making sure that stowaways do not board their vehicles, and can be fined or jailed if they do not detect and remove a stowaway when crossing national borders.

Ship travel 
Stowaways on sailing ships and on steamships made this way of illicit travel known throughout the world. Throughout the nineteenth and twentieth centuries poor, would-be emigrants and travelers seeking adventure for no cost helped to make it seem romantic. Noted stowaways to America by steamship have included Henry Armetta, Bruno Richard Hauptmann, Willem de Kooning, Jan Valtin, and Florentino Das.

Air travel 

Poor perimeter security at a number of airports around the world can make it easier for people to stow away on planes.

Stowaways in aircraft wheel wells face numerous health risks, many of which are fatal: being mangled when the undercarriage retracts, tinnitus, deafness, hypothermia, hypoxia, frostbite, acidosis and finally falling when the doors of the compartment reopen. The landing gear compartment is not equipped with heating, pressure or oxygen, which are vital for survival at a high altitude. By  the oxygen level of the blood drops and the person will struggle to stay conscious. Above  their lungs would need artificial pressure to operate normally. Those stowaways who managed to not be crushed by the retracting undercarriage or killed by the deadly conditions would most likely be unconscious when the compartment door re-opens during the approach and fall several thousand feet to their deaths.

David Learmount, an aviation expert of Flight International, told BBC about a lot of ignorance in this area. He suggested that no one would be willing to risk such a journey having full understanding of this kind of ordeal. Stowaways who survived usually travelled relatively short distances or at a low altitude. Almost all aircraft stowaways are male.

In 1965, Brian Robson attempted to mail himself in a crate on a flight from Melbourne, Australia to London. The flight was diverted to Los Angeles, where he was discovered after four days in the crate. In one reported case, in 2003, a young man mailed himself in a large box and had it shipped on UPS planes from New York City to Texas. He survived because the box travelled in a pressurized hold of an aircraft.

From 1947 until September 2012, there were 96 known stowaway attempts worldwide in wheel wells of 85 separate flights, which resulted in 73 deaths with only 23 survivors.

Legal consequences 
Stowaways may risk being fined or imprisoned, since it is illegal in most jurisdictions to embark on aircraft, boats or trains as stowaways. Airports, sea ports and train stations are typically marked as "no trespassing" or "private property" zones to anyone but customers and employees. Seaports, train stations, and airports often attempt further security by designating restricted areas with signs saying "Authorized Personnel Only".

Since the September 11 attacks, it has become more difficult to be a stowaway on board transportation arriving to or departing from the United States. Airport security has dramatically increased, and among the new security measures is trained professionals watching over the fences from which stowaways usually gain entrance to an airport's runway.

See also 
 Deadly Voyage
 Freedom of Movement
 Human mail
 Illegal emigration
 Marilyn Hartman
 Train surfing (Freighthopping)
 Air Canada masked stowaway case

References

External links 
 Survival at high altitudes: wheel-well passengers
 Aviat Space Environ Med. 1996 Aug;67(8):784-6
 The 1996 study was updated and published by The Flight Safety Foundation in 1997

 
Crimes
Transport terminology